Dolichoderus setosus is a species of ant in the genus Dolichoderus. Described by Kempf in 1959, the species is endemic to Brazil.

References

Dolichoderus
Hymenoptera of South America
Insects described in 1959